Matthew McQueen may refer to:

 Matthew McQueen (Hollyoaks), a character from the soap opera Hollyoaks
 Matthew McQueen (politician) (born 1957), member of the New Mexico House of Representatives
 Matt McQueen (1863–1944), Scottish footballer
 Matthewdavid (Matthew David McQueen, born 1984), American record producer and DJ